Don't Call Me Girlie is a 1985 documentary about women in the Australian film industry in the 1920s and 1930s. There was an accompanying book, Brilliant Careers, by Andree Wright.

It features Aileen Britton, Charlotte Francis, Nancy Gurr, Jean Hatton, Jocelyn Howarth, Louise Lovely, Lottie Lyell, McDonagh Sisters, Marjorie Osborne, Shirley Ann Richards and Helen Twelvetrees.

The title is taken from a line spoken by Shirley Ann Richards in Dad and Dave Come to Town (1938).

External links
Don't Call Me Girlie at TCMDB

Don't Call Me Girlie at Peter Malone
Film page at Ronin films

1985 films
Australian documentary films
Documentary films about women in film
Women in Australia